På väg, 1982–86 is a three CD box set from Swedish pop artist Per Gessle. It was released on 1 July 1992 and includes Gessle's first two solo albums, Scener and Per Gessle, plus a Demos CD titled Demos, 1982-86.

Track listings

Tracks 14-16 on disc 1 and 13-16 on disc 2 are bonus tracks.

References

1992 compilation albums
Per Gessle albums